John Cummings is a Scottish musician and record producer, best known for being a  former member of Glaswegian band Mogwai, mostly playing guitar, as well as programming, keyboards and vocals.

Career

Mogwai

After forming and playing a few gigs in 1995 as a three-piece, Mogwai enlisted John Cummings on guitar. Though he mostly contributed guitar to the band, Cummings has also sung on the song "Boring Machines Disturbs Sleep", from 2003's Happy Songs for Happy People. He left Mogwai in November 2015 to pursue a solo career.

The Reindeer Section
Cummings was briefly a member of indie rock supergroup, The Reindeer Section, contributing guitar to the first album.

Other
Cummings produced Part Chimp's albums Chart Pimp and I Am Come, the Errors EP How Clean is your Acid House?, The Magnificents album Year of Explorers, Trout's Norma Jean EP and Street Horrrsing by Fuck Buttons.

He also contributed guitar to The Zephyrs' 2004 album, A Year to the Day and Setting Sun from their 2001 album When The Sky Comes Down It Comes Down On Your Head.

In 2015 Cummings composed the musical score of the documentary film S Is for Stanley.

Equipment
Throughout his time in Mogwai, Cummings has mainly used various models of the Fender Telecaster Custom and Gibson SG, often using irregular tunings.

Effects pedals
 Boss AW-3 Dynamic Wah
 Boss DD-7 Digital Delay
 Boss LS-2 Line Selector
 Boss OS-2 Overdrive/Distortion (2)
 Boss ODB-3 Bass Overdrive
 Boss TR-2 Tremolo
 Boss TU-2 Chromatic Tuner
 Death By Audio Interstellar Overdrive Deluxe
 Dead By Audio Supersonic Fuzz Gun
 Electro-Harmonix HOG (2)
 Electro-Harmonix Holy Stain
 Electro-Harmonix Stereo Memory Man With Hazarai
 Jim Dunlop Uni-Vibe
 MXR Carbon Copy Delay
 MXR Phase 90 Script
 MXR Kerry King 10 Band EQ (2)
 Way Huge Fat Sandwich 
 Way Huge Auquapus 
 T-Rex Dr Swamp Distortion/Overdrive

References

Year of birth missing (living people)
Living people
Mogwai members
Scottish rock guitarists
Scottish male guitarists
Scottish songwriters
People educated at St Aloysius' College, Glasgow